Comparative analysis may refer to:

Comparative contextual analysis, a technique used in criminology
Comparative bullet-lead analysis, a technique used in forensics
Qualitative comparative analysis, a data analysis technique used in social science
Centre for the Comparative Analysis of Law and Economics, Economics of Law, Economics of Institutions, a research center

See also 
 Comparative (disambiguation)